Crumple is the second studio album of South Korean music producer Code Kunst. It was self-released on April 28, 2015. It was later nominated for Best Rap Album at the Korean Music Awards and peaked at number 34 on the Gaon Album Chart.

Background 
In an interview with BNT, Code Kunst explained why he named the album Crumple.
People's faces usually crumple when they really appreciate music or movies. I got inspiration from that. It is a form of admiration that is shown on the face.

Music and lyrics 
Code Kunst creates a dreamy atmosphere by using various synth sounds on top of a rhythm with thick texture. While his signature technique of combining noise and vocal sources is used, variations in beats such as the second half of "Dig!" and "What I Feel" stand out. Meanwhile, the featuring artists share their stories by rapping tightly as if they were competing with each other.

"Golden Cow" depicts the past and present of C Jamm and Code Kunst. "Edison" bodies out the image of experimenting in a laboratory through variations in the hook and bridge. "Love Scene" is the suicide note of a "pathetic" Asian man who fell in love with a beautiful white woman but got beaten up by her boyfriend. It reinterprets the texture and mood of hip hop drums in Britpop style.

Critical reception 
Lee Jin-seok of Rhythmer rated the album 4 out of 5 stars. According to him, it is evident that Code Kunst paid close attention to the texture and sound of each track and the instrument and sound sources are well harmonized.

Critics of Music Y rated "Address" 4 out of 5 stars. According to Kim Jeong-won, it reflects Hwaji's concern about how to tell his story and reveals Code Kunst's ability to bring it forth.

Year-end lists

Awards and nominations

Track listing

Charts

Sales

References 

2015 albums
Hip hop albums by South Korean artists